The Food That Built America is an American nonfiction docudrama series for the History Channel, that premiered on August 11, 2019. Each episode tells a story behind the biggest food brands in the United States. The series have scenes that uses actors to dramatize historical events which are interspersed with commentary by culinary historians and other commentators.

The series was first announced in March 2019. The first season premiered on August 11, 2019, and ran for three episodes until August 13. In May 2020, the series was renewed for a second season, which premiered on February 9, 2021, and ran for 16 episodes. The third season premiered on February 27, 2022, and consisted of 12 episodes. The fourth season premiered on February 19, 2023, and will consist of an unknown number of episodes.

Episodes

Series overview

Season 1 (2019)

Season 2 (2021)

Season 3 (2022)

Season 4 (2023)

Production 

In March 2019, the series was green-lit. In May 2020, the series was renewed for a second season. Yoshi Stone is the series' showrunner. Along with Stone, Kim Woodard, Greg Henry, and Isaac Holub executive produce for Lucky 8. Jim Pasquarella and Mary E. Donahue executive produce for the History Channel.

Reception 

The first season garnered a total of 18.8 million viewers.

Podcast 

In February 2021, the History Channel partnered with OZY Media to launch a podcast of the same name. The first episode premiered on February 4, 2021.

The Food That Built America Snack Sized

In 2021, the producers of The Food That Built America created a new series called The Food That Built America Snack Sized by reediting some episodes to approximately half of the original size through the elimination of food historian commentary and some minor scenes to make smaller size episodes with a faster pace.

References

External links
 
 
 

2019 American television series debuts
2010s American reality television series
2020s American reality television series
History (American TV channel) original programming
English-language television shows
Food and drink television series